Assamese may refer to:

 Assamese people, a socio-ethnolinguistic identity of north-eastern India
 People of Assam, multi-ethnic, multi-linguistic and multi-religious people of Assam
 Assamese language, one of the easternmost Indo-Aryan languages
 Assamese alphabet, a writing system of the Assamese language
 Culture of Assam, the culture of Assamese people
 Assamese cuisine, a style of cooking
 Assam tea, a black tea
 Assam silk, three types of indigenous wild silk

Language and nationality disambiguation pages